68 Yeni Aksarayspor is a football club located in Aksaray, Turkey. The team competes in TFF Third League.The club was promoted to the TFF Third League after 2012–13 season. The club promoted again in 2018–2019 season to the TFF Third League after beating Akhisarspor on penalty shootout.

League participations 
TFF Third League: 2019–present
Turkish Regional Amateur League: 2014–2019
TFF Third League: 2013–2014
Turkish Regional Amateur League: 2010–2013

Stadium 
Currently the team plays at the 575 capacity Dağılgan Stadium.

Current squad

References

External links 
68 Yeni Aksarayspor on TFF.org

TFF Third League clubs
Football clubs in Turkey